Charles Archibald Hope (born April 1945) is a British art historian who was director of The Warburg Institute from 2001 to 2010. He was succeeded by Peter Mack. He is a specialist in Italian art of the 15th and 16th centuries, especially Venetian painting.

Selected publications
Titian
Bronzino's 'Allegory' in the National Gallery.
The Chronology of Mantegna's "Triumphs".
The early history of the Tempio Malatestiano.
The Genius of Venice, 1500-1600
Giorgione or Titian?: History of a controversy

References 

1945 births
Directors of the Warburg Institute
British art historians
Living people